Elizabeth Pennisi is an American science journalist specializing in genomics, evolution, and microbiology.

Life 
Pennisi completed a bachelor's degree in biology at Cornell University. She earned a master's degree in science writing from Boston University.

Pennisi worked for the public relations office of a university where she wrote for the school's science magazine. She also worked briefly with United Press International. Pennisi joined Science in 1996 and became an editor in 2007. She also writes for Science News for which she won the 1996 James T. Grady-James H. Stack Award for Interpreting Chemistry.

References

Citations

Bibliography 

Living people
Year of birth missing (living people)
Place of birth missing (living people)
Cornell University alumni
Boston University alumni
American science journalists
Women science writers
21st-century American journalists
21st-century American women writers
American women journalists